Asian Leader was launched in 2001, it features, Motoring Technology and information catering for this unique Asian audience.. 30,000 Copies of Asian Leader Distributed Free every Fortnightly via 800+ strategic pick up points in heart of the Asian communities throughout the region. With an excellent Pickup ratio.

Independent English language newspaper with the readership of 120,000 plus. Specifically aimed at this vibrant and growing 3rd 4th generation Asian business and professional population.

Published in print and Digital edition online every fortnight, the Asian Leader is full of compelling local, National and international news, fashion, entertainment, with a portfolio including Eid Magazines and the Wedding Magazine. Best Asian Media Ltd offers access to a comprehensive range of media services for readers and businesses alike. They also offer advice and consultancy services to clients, arrange and deliver Events, PR, Brand and communication strategy.

Asian Leader readers are of working age, educated, consumer-driven and represent an unprecedented purchasing power.
 
The Asian Leader is the natural choice for advertisers seeking to reach this important hard to reach demographic. Recognising diversity across cultures, nationalities and religions and promoting equal opportunities for all.

www.asianleader.co.uk

See also
 Urban Media
 Desi Xpress

Newspapers published in Manchester